Redwater Independent School District is a public school district based in Redwater, Texas (USA).  A very small portion of the district is within the town of Leary, but no one lives in that portion as it is part of the Red River Army Depot.

In 2009, the school district was rated "recognized" by the Texas Education Agency.

Schools
Redwater High School(Grades 9-12)
Redwater Junior High (Grades 7-8)
Redwater Middle (Grades 4-6)
Redwater Elementary (Grades PK-3)

References

External links
Redwater ISD

School districts in Bowie County, Texas